Waterloo is a city in Linn County, Oregon, United States. The population was 229 at the 2010 census.

The city's name, a joking reference to the Battle of Waterloo, stemmed from a 19th-century court decision that settled a land dispute at Kees Mill along the South Santiam River. After the dispute ended, Kees Mill became known as Waterloo.

The federal government established a post office at Waterloo on January 5, 1875. S. D. Granger was its first postmaster. The post office closed in 1974.

Geography
The closest city is Lebanon.

Climate
This region experiences warm (but not hot) and dry summers, with no average monthly temperatures above .  According to the Köppen Climate Classification system, Waterloo has a warm-summer Mediterranean climate, abbreviated "Csb" on climate maps.

Demographics

2010 census
As of the census of 2010, there were 229 people, 79 households, and 62 families living in the town. The racial makeup of the town was 96.5% White, 1.3% Native American, 0.4% from other races, and 1.7% from two or more races. Hispanic or Latino of any race were 5.7% of the population.

There were 79 households, of which 29.1% had children under the age of 18 living with them, 62.0% were married couples living together, 11.4% had a female householder with no husband present, 5.1% had a male householder with no wife present, and 21.5% were non-families. 17.7% of all households were made up of individuals, and 3.8% had someone living alone who was 65 years of age or older. The average household size was 2.90 and the average family size was 3.27.

The median age in the town was 42.3 years. 22.7% of residents were under the age of 18; 7% were between the ages of 18 and 24; 25.3% were from 25 to 44; 31.5% were from 45 to 64; and 13.5% were 65 years of age or older. The gender makeup of the town was 52.8% male and 47.2% female.

2000 census
As of the census of 2000, there were 239 people, 83 households, and 60 families living in the city. The population density was 1,583.2 people per square mile (615.2/km). There were 91 housing units at an average density of 602.8 per square mile (234.2/km). The racial makeup of the city was 97.49% White, 0.42% African American, 1.26% Native American, 0.42% Asian, and 0.42% from two or more races. Hispanic or Latino of any race were 2.09% of the population.

There were 83 households, out of which 27.7% had children under the age of 18 living with them, 59.0% were married couples living together, 8.4% had a female householder with no husband present, and 27.7% were non-families. 20.5% of all households were made up of individuals, and 9.6% had someone living alone who was 65 years of age or older. The average household size was 2.88 and the average family size was 3.33.

In the city, the population was spread out, with 29.3% under the age of 18, 7.5% from 18 to 24, 25.5% from 25 to 44, 24.7% from 45 to 64, and 13.0% who were 65 years of age or older. The median age was 34 years. For every 100 females, there were 104.3 males. For every 100 females age 18 and over, there were 103.6 males.

The median income for a household in the city was $34,688, and the median income for a family was $39,583. Males had a median income of $32,250 versus $25,000 for females. The per capita income for the city was $13,931. About 10.9% of families and 11.7% of the population were below the poverty line, including 8.8% of those under the age of eighteen and 13.8% of those 65 or over.

References

External links
 Entry for Waterloo in the Oregon Blue Book

Cities in Oregon
Cities in Linn County, Oregon
1893 establishments in Oregon
Populated places established in 1893